Kopparbergs Brewery  (literally "Copper Mountain's Brewery") is a Swedish brewery and cider company based in Bergslagen.

Kopparberg Cider 
Kopparberg Cider is made by Kopparberg Breweries in the town of Kopparberg in central Sweden. Established in 1882, the brewery is family owned and is the main employer for the tiny town of just 4,000 people. Kopparberg Breweries AB is Sweden's largest cider brewing company.

Kopparberg UK 

Kopparberg was introduced to the United Kingdom in 2003 by B O Times1 Limited.

Originally launched in apple and pear cider variations, the non-alcoholic pear and mixed fruit ciders were introduced in late 2007. 

It is available in many variants such as apple, pear, strawberry, mixed fruit, strawberry & lime, blueberry & lime, elderflower & lime, rhubarb, raspberry, cherry, passionfruit, passionfruit & orange, rosé, spiced apple (apple & cinnamon), lemon & lime, alcohol free pear, alcohol free mixed fruit, mixed fruit tropical and Summer and Winter fruits.

References

External links 
Kopparbergs Brewery homepage  
Kopparberg UK Promotional Site
Kopparberg UK Twitter
Kopparberg Facebook
Kopparberg Instagram

Companies based in Örebro County
Breweries in Sweden
Brands of cider
Swedish brands
Food and drink companies established in 1882
Swedish companies established in 1882